Gone Postal was a four-piece Icelandic death metal band from Kópavogur, Iceland, founded in 2007 by Haukur Hannes and Nökkvi G. Gylfason.

History 
Gone Postal was formed in 2007 by Haukur Hannes (guitar) and Nökkvi G. Gylfason (guitar, vocals), along with Þorbjörn Steingrímsson (vocals) and Jón P. Gunnarsson (drums). It started playing hardcore in early 2007. With the dismissal of Jón and the recruitment of Stefán A. Stefánsson (drums) and Karl B. Flosason (bass), the band focused more on death metal. Gone Postal recorded a self-produced web-based album during the summer of 2007, entitled In the Depths of Despair, which never saw the light of day in the form of an actual album. The album contained 6 tracks that would eventually be re-recorded to be published on the 2008 album with the same title.

Karl was dismissed in late 2007, resulting in the recruitment of Úlfur Hansson, who stayed with the band as session bassist until early 2008. By that time, Gone Postal had formed a following in the Icelandic death metal community. The band recruited Daníel S. Hallgrímsson shortly after Úlfur left, who stayed with the band until late 2008.

In January 2008, Gone Postal started recording their full-length debut, In the Depths of Despair, which was finished in the autumn of the same year. It was officially released on December 2, 2008, and contained 10 songs.

In 2009, Nökkvi stated in an interview that: "...the reason for releasing a full length album is that it's so unheard of within the Icelandic metal scene. Bands usually just release four or five song demos or ep's and we just didn't want to do that since we had enough material for a full-length album".

In January 2009 Gone Postal announced that they will be taking a short break from performing in order to complete writing, practicing and recording their second album, working title "Spearheading the Umbrageous".

In February 2009 founding member Haukur Hannes left Gone Postal due to musical and personal differences.

The band ended in 2014 and the remaining members (Ævar Örn Sigurðsson, Þorbjörn Steingrímsson, Nökkvi G. Gylfason and 
Stefán Ari Stefánsson) reformed it on 2015 and shifted their musical focus towards black metal under the name Zhrine and released their new album Unortheta under that name on April 8, 2016 to critical acclaim. Stefánsson left Zhrine after the release of Unortheta and was replaced by Tumi Snær Gíslason.

Members
 Þorbjörn Steingrímsson (2007–2014) - vocals, guitar
 Nökkvi G. Gylfason (2007–2014) - guitar, vocals
 Ævar Örn Sigurðsson (2008–2014) - bass
 Stefán A. Stefánsson (2007–2014) - drums

Former members
 Tristan Barnes (2010) - guitar
 Haukur Hannes (2007–2009) - guitar
 Daníel S. Hallgrímsson (2008) - bass
 Karl B. Flosason (2007) - bass
 Úlfur Hansson (session live) (2007) - bass

Discography

Studio albums

Other

References

External links 
Gone Postal's official website on Myspace

Icelandic death metal musical groups
Musical groups established in 2007
Musical quartets